Fafá de Belém, born Maria de Fátima Palha de Figueiredo in Belém do Pará on August 9, 1956, is a Brazilian singer considered one of the great female singers of MPB (Musica Popular Brasileira). She took her stage name from the city of her birth and in addition to a successful recording career that spans over three decades, it is fair to say that she has been one of the great sex symbols of Brazilian pop music. Her husky mezzo-soprano voice is known for its extensive emotional range, from tender ballads, to sensual love songs, to Portuguese fados all the way to energetic sambas and lambadas.

Biography 

Born in Belém in 1956, she made her public debut in her home town in 1973. In the next year she performed shows with Zé Rodrix in Rio de Janeiro and with Sérgio Ricardo in Belém and Salvador da Bahia. In the same year she hit the charts with "Filho da Bahia", then recorded for the soundtrack of the TV Globo soap opera Gabriela; she also released her first single that year. In 1976 Fafá de Belém recorded her first LP; Tamba Tajá, which was praised by critics. In 1984 she became the muse of the movement in favour of free elections in Brazil, singing "Menestrel das Alagoas" (pt), written by Milton Nascimento and Fernando Brant, before a million people in Rio de Janeiro. In the same period her highly popular interpretation of the Brazilian National Anthem at mass gatherings got her into trouble with the ruling military regime that was soon replaced by a popularly elected president.

In 1993 her album Meu Fado went platinum in Portugal, one of the countries where she is widely popular. Though not a composer herself she has recorded memorable covers of Brazil's greatest composers, notably her all-Chico Buarque CD Tanto Mar released in 2004. Fafa's 2005 release Novo Millennium, a compilation of hits and some new material, sold 500,000 copies in its first month in stores.

Her album Humana was considered one of the 25 best Brazilian albums of the first half of 2019 by the São Paulo Association of Art Critics.

Discography

 1976 – Tamba-Tajá
 1977 – Água
 1978 – Banho de cheiro
 1979 – Estrela radiante
 1980 – Crença
 1982 – Essential
 1983 – Fafá de Belém
 1985 – Aprendizes da esperança
 1986 – Atrevida
 1987 – Grandes amores
 1988 – Sozinha
 1989 – Fafá
 1991 – Doces palavras
 1992 – Meu fado
 1993 – Do fundo do meu coração
 1994 – Cantiga pra ninar meu namorado
 1995 – Fafá – ao vivo
 1996 – Pássaro sonhador
 1998 – Coração brasileiro
 2000 – Maria de Fátima Palha Figueiredo
 2002 – Voz e piano – ao vivo
 2002 – O canto das águas
 2004 – Tanto mar – Fafá de Belém canta Chico Buarque
 2007 – Fafá de Belém – ao vivo (CD e DVD)
 2015 – Do Tamanho Certo para o Meu Sorriso
 2017 – Do Tamanho Certo para o Meu Sorriso - Ao Vivo
 2019 – Humana

References

External links

 Official Web Site

1956 births
Living people
20th-century Brazilian women singers
20th-century Brazilian singers
Brazilian people of Portuguese descent
Brazilian actresses
Brazilian mezzo-sopranos
Música Popular Brasileira singers
People from Belém
21st-century Brazilian women singers
21st-century Brazilian singers
Women in Latin music